The Union for the Presidential Majority  ( UMP) is the ruling political coalition in Djibouti. The coalition supports the Presidency of Ismaïl Omar Guelleh.

The coalition originally formed to contest the 2003 parliamentary election, and support Guelleh in the 2005 presidential election.

The coalition is composed of four parties; the RPP, the FRUD, the PSD, and the UPR.

Members

Former Members

Electoral history

Presidential elections

National Assembly elections

References 

2003 establishments in Djibouti
Political party alliances in Djibouti
Socialism in Djibouti
Social democratic parties in Africa